The Hoher Kranzberg is a mountain in Bavaria, Germany. Compared to its neighbours in the Wetterstein Mountains and the Karwendel Mountains, the Hoher Kranzberg is more of a gentle grass hill.

References

Mountains of Bavaria
Mountains of the Alps